

Description 

Kurnool bus station is a bus station located in Kurnool city of the Indian state of Andhra Pradesh. It is owned by Andhra Pradesh State Road Transport Corporation.

Kurnool is the Gate way of Rayalaseema. Every bus depot in Rayalaseema region runs Bus services to Kurnool. Buses are also available for almost every city and town in Southern Andhra Pradesh and Southern Karnataka.

Another Major Bus operators are KSRTC which runs from Karnataka and TSRTC of Telangana.
 This is one of the major bus stations in the state, which have services to major cities and towns in the state and to other states like Karnataka, and Telangana.

Expansion works

Now bus station expansion works are going under process while the city is said to run city busses from 2020 as the second phase of launching city busses in Andhra Pradesh cities.

Depot 
Kurnool Bus station has 2 depots

 Kurnool - 1 Depot. 
 Kurnool - 2 Depot.

Transit Distance 

Services from Kurnool Bus stand to other depots within the district

Bus Depots within the District

Major and frequent services to the towns other than depots in the district from kurnool are

Out Side the District major Services

Source 
https://www.apsrtc.ap.gov.in/Depots.php

http://www.apsrtclivetrack.com/#/

References

Bus stations in Andhra Pradesh
Kurnool
Buildings and structures in Kurnool district
Transport in Kurnool district